The Tailor of Panama is a 2001 spy thriller film directed by John Boorman from a screenplay he co-wrote with John le Carré and Andrew Davies. Based on le Carré's 1996 novel of the same name, it stars Pierce Brosnan and Geoffrey Rush. Rush portrays the title character, a former convict turned tailor who is strong-armed by an amoral MI6 agent (Brosnan) into spying on the Panamanian government. Jamie Lee Curtis, Brendan Gleeson, Catherine McCormack, Leonor Varela, and Harold Pinter co-star, along with Daniel Radcliffe in his film debut.

The film premiered at the Berlin International Film Festival on 11 February 2001, and was released theatrically in the United States by Columbia Pictures on 30 March. It received positive reviews, with praise for the performances of Brosnan and Rush, and grossed $28 million on a $21 million budget.

Plot 
Andy Osnard is an MI6 spy reassigned to Panama after having an affair in Madrid with the foreign minister's mistress. His superior warns him of the corruption present in Panama, but Osnard views that as an opportunity. Consulting a list of British citizens residing in Panama, he meets Harry Pendel, the tailor to many of Panama's elite, including the President. Pendel, a gifted storyteller, passes himself off as being formerly of Savile Row, but is in fact an ex-con who used to run scams with his late uncle Benny. Pendel's American wife Louisa, the assistant to the administrator of the Panama Canal Authority, is unaware of his criminal record. While Harry is a superb tailor, he is a bad businessman; his tailor shop is constantly in debt, and he owes $50,000 of Louisa's money to the bank for a farming business that failed.

Knowing that Pendel needs money, Osnard offers to help him, if Pendel feeds him information about the elite of Panama City. Pendel agrees, and uses the money to pay off his debts and help his friend Mickie, a down-on-his-luck alcoholic, and his assistant Marta, who was raped and disfigured by Manuel Noriega's soldiers. However, Osnard soon requires better information, threatening to cut off the money and reveal that Pendel has been spying for a foreign government if he does not get what he wants.

Pendel starts "tailoring" his stories, escalating the roles of friends to make them appear more significant than they are. He casts Mickie as a revolutionary who still holds sway over the youth of Panama, and his shop manager as the leader of an opposition movement. After fixing the suit of the President of Panama (whose conversation consisted of his suit being too tight), he comes up with a tale that the president intends to sell the canal to China. When an incredulous Osnard asks which, Beijing or Taiwan, Pendel replies "both". Osnard knows that Pendel is making up these stories, but does not care as long as his superiors believe them.

As he passes along this misinformation (bypassing the embassy staff, apart from Francesca, a staffer he is sleeping with), it makes its way to Washington, where military and government officials are alarmed and plan an invasion to prevent the canal from falling into Chinese hands. Pendel, meanwhile, seeks to end his spying, saying the opposition won't listen to him because it needs $10 million. He thinks the figure will put Osnard off, but Osnard relays a request to fund the opposition as a means to control Panama after this supposed revolution; he asks for $15 million, which is granted by the Pentagon. Osnard's superior arrives with a briefcase containing the money, ready to meet with the opposition, while American attack helicopters are preparing for an assault on the city.

The British Ambassador uncovers what Osnard has been up to, and threatens to reveal everything. Osnard pays for his silence and cooperation with $1.25 million. Osnard manages to ditch his superior and make off with the briefcase. Meanwhile, Pendel gets a call from Marta, who tells him that Mickie has committed suicide out of fear that he would go to prison for his supposed revolutionary ties. Pendel blames himself for Mickie's death, and resolves to thwart Osnard's plans. He waylays Osnard as he flees to the airport, but Osnard gives him the slip.

Louisa, who has to fight off Osnard after she goes to investigate him and he holds his hand over her mouth, gropes her, and throws her on a bed, finds out what Pendel has been doing and races to the Administrator's office. The Administrator contacts the President of Panama, who is able to contact the U.S. government and have the invasion called off shortly after it began. During the confusion, Osnard goes to the airport, where he meets the Ambassador and hands him his bribe. The Ambassador allows Osnard to get on an airplane.

Pendel returns home to Louisa and tells her about his criminal past, and she forgives him. Osnard, meanwhile, escapes the country with the money.

Cast

Production 
The Tailor of Panama was shot at the Ardmore Studios in County Wicklow, Ireland, and on location in Panama City, Lake Gatun, and Gamboa, Panama. It was produced by Boorman's Irish production company Merlin Films, with financial support from Columbia Pictures.

Like the novel, the film is inspired by Graham Greene's 1958 novel Our Man in Havana, which depicts intelligence agencies believing reports from local informants in Cuba. Whereas the novel was set in the 1990s, before the American withdrawal from the Panama Canal Zone, the film moves the time period to the 21st century.

In the original ending of the film Osnard is shot by Pendel. This was changed to allow Osnard to escape.

Reception 
The film holds a 75% approval rating on Rotten Tomatoes with an average rating of 6.80/10 based on 118 reviews. The site's consensus states: "The Tailor of Panama is a smart, darkly satirical thriller with exuberant performances from Pierce Brosnan and Geoffrey Rush." On Metacritic, it holds a score of 66 out of 100 based on reviews from 31 critics, indicating "generally favorable reviews".

References

External links 
 
 

2001 films
2000s spy films
2000s thriller drama films
American thriller drama films
Irish drama films
English-language Irish films
2000s Spanish-language films
Films directed by John Boorman
Films based on works by John le Carré
Films about the Secret Intelligence Service
Films set in Panama
Films shot in Ireland
Films shot in Panama
Films shot in the Republic of Ireland
Columbia Pictures films
2001 drama films
2000s English-language films
2000s American films